Billy the Kid's Range War is a 1941 American Western film directed by Sam Newfield that was the fourth of Producers Releasing Corporation's Billy the Kid film series. Despite the film's title and mention of Lincoln County, there is neither a range war nor even a range seen in the film.

This film is the fourth in the "Billy the Kid" film series, produced by PRC from 1940 to 1946.

Plot

Once again Billy the Kid is pursued by the law for crimes he hasn't committed. With the help of a sympathetic marshal and Mexican range detective, Billy and his cantankerous slingshot wielding sidekick Fuzzy get the chance to clear Billy's name by helping Ellen Gorman, the owner of a stagecoach line menaced by villains backed by a corrupt sheriff.

Cast 

Bob Steele as Billy the Kid
Al St. John as Fuzzy Q. Jones
Carleton Young as Marshal Jeff Carson
Joan Barclay as Ellen Gorman
Milton Kibbee as Leonard - Ellen's Guardian
Rex Lease as Buck
Karl Hackett as Williams
Ted Adams as Sheriff Black
Julian Rivero as Miguel Romero
Stephen Chase as Lawyer Dave Hendrix
Howard Masters as Ab Jenkins
Buddy Roosevelt as Henchman Spike

See also

The "Billy the Kid" films starring Bob Steele:
 Billy the Kid Outlawed (1940)
 Billy the Kid in Texas (1940)
 Billy the Kid's Gun Justice (1940)
 Billy the Kid's Range War (1941)
 Billy the Kid's Fighting Pals (1941)
 Billy the Kid in Santa Fe (1941)

External links 

 

1941 Western (genre) films
1941 films
American black-and-white films
American Western (genre) films
Billy the Kid (film series)
Producers Releasing Corporation films
Films directed by Sam Newfield
1940s English-language films
1940s American films